Portrait of Giulio Clovio is a Renaissance era painting by El Greco c.1571. It was commissioned by Italian cardinal Alessandro Farnese during the artist's stay in Rome. It formed part of the Farnese collection. Charles of Bourbon inherited it in 1734 and moved it to Naples, where it now hangs in the Museo di Capodimonte.

Its subject Giulio Clovio (born 1498, Croatia) was a noted miniaturist, called "the Michelangelo of the miniature" by Giorgio Vasari. He had helped El Greco settle in Rome. Clovio is shown holding his masterpiece work, the Farnese Hours. In the background, there is a window showing a landscape and a stormy sky.

Bibliography 
  J. Álvarez Lopera, El Greco, Madrid, Arlanza (2005), Biblioteca «Descubrir el Arte», (colección «Grandes maestros»). 
  M. Scholz-Hanzsel, El Greco, Colonia, Taschen (2003).

References

Clovio, Giulio
1570s paintings
16th-century portraits
Farnese Collection
Paintings in the collection of the Museo di Capodimonte